Aaron Ollett (born 19 November 1992) is a professional UK rugby league footballer who plays as a  or  for the Doncaster R.L.F.C. in Betfred League 1.

He was developed through Hull KR's academy, and was loaned to Newcastle Thunder, where he is appeared fairly regularly as a Hooker. He has made 7 appearances in the 2014 season and scored 2 tries.

On 13 June 2014, Aaron Ollett appeared for Hull Kingston Rovers in a 34-4 defeat by Warrington Wolves. He has also been picked in Hull Kingston Rovers' squad against Bradford Bulls on 20 June 2014 along with fellow youngster Sonny Esslemont.

In October 2015 he joined Keighley Cougars. This was followed by a move to Dewsbury Rams for the 2017 Season. In November 2017 Ollett signed with Newcastle for the 2018 season.

References

External links
Newcastle Thunder profile
Dewsbury Rams profile

1992 births
Living people
Dewsbury Rams players
Doncaster R.L.F.C. players
English rugby league players
Hull Kingston Rovers players
Keighley Cougars players
Newcastle Thunder players
Place of birth missing (living people)
Rugby league second-rows
Rugby league locks